Applewood is an unincorporated community and a census-designated place (CDP) located in and governed by Jefferson County, Colorado, United States. The CDP is a part of the Denver–Aurora–Lakewood, CO Metropolitan Statistical Area. The population of the Applewood CDP was 7,833 at the 2020 United States Census. The Golden post office (Zip code 80401) serves the area.

Geography
It is bordered to the north by Fairmount, to the northeast by Wheat Ridge, to the southeast by Lakewood, and to the southwest by West Pleasant View. South Table Mountain borders Applewood to the west.

The Applewood CDP has an area of  including  of water.

Demographics

Education
Applewood is served by the Jefferson County School District R-1.

See also

Colorado
Outline of Colorado
Index of Colorado-related articles
List of places in Colorado
List of cities and towns in Colorado
List of census-designated places in Colorado
List of counties in Colorado
Jefferson County, Colorado
Jefferson County School District R-1
Colorado statistical areas
Front Range Urban Corridor
North Central Colorado Urban Area
Denver–Aurora, CO Combined Statistical Area
Denver–Aurora–Lakewood, CO Metropolitan Statistical Area

References

External links

Applewood Valley Association (AVA)
Applewood Business Association
Applewood Community
Prospect Recreation & Park District
Applewood Golf Course
Jefferson County website
Jeffco Public Schools

Census-designated places in Jefferson County, Colorado
Census-designated places in Colorado
Denver metropolitan area